Kanjvaran-e Sofla (also Romanized as Kanjvarān-e Soflá; also known as Ganjūrān, Ganjvarān, Ganjvarān-e Soflá, and Kanjūrān) is a village in Miyan Rud Rural District, Qolqol Rud District, Tuyserkan County, Hamadan Province, Iran. At the 2006 census, its population was 523, in 112 families.

References 

Populated places in Tuyserkan County